Anastasius II or Anastasios II may refer to:

Pope Anastasius II, pope in 496–498
Anastasius II of Antioch, patriarch in 599–609
Anastasius II of Jerusalem, patriarch in 705–706
Anastasios II, emperor in 713–715